The women's individual archery event at the 1976 Summer Olympics was part of the archery programme. The event consisted of a double FITA round. For each round, the archer shot 36 arrows at each of four distances—70, 60, 50, and 30 metres. The highest score for each arrow was 10 points, giving a possible maximum of 2880 points. 16 nations sent 27 athletes to the women's competition in archery.

Luann Ryon of the United States broke both of her countrywoman Doreen Wilber's Olympic records in the event (FITA round and double FITA round) on her way to the second straight gold medal for an American in the women's competition.  The Soviet women repeated their bronze medal from 1972 and gained a silver medal as well.

Records

The following new Olympic records were set during this competition.

Results

References

External links
Official Olympic Report

W
1976 in women's archery
Women's events at the 1976 Summer Olympics